Johan Gallén (28 April 1888 – 17 September 1962) was a Finnish wrestler. He competed in the freestyle light heavyweight event at the 1920 Summer Olympics.

References

External links
 

1888 births
1962 deaths
People from Lohja
People from Uusimaa Province (Grand Duchy of Finland)
Olympic wrestlers of Finland
Wrestlers at the 1920 Summer Olympics
Finnish male sport wrestlers
Sportspeople from Uusimaa